Işık (Turkish: Light) is a Turkish name. It may also refer to:

Işık faith or Ishikism, syncretic religious movement among Alevis 
Işık University, private university in Istanbul, Turkey
Işık Doğudan Yükselir, 1995 album by Sezen Aksu